Muhamed Lamine Jabula Sanó (born 6 December 1979 in Bissau), simply Malá, is a retired Bissau-Guinean football midfielder.

International career
Malá also capped for the national team.

External links

lpfp.pt 

1979 births
Living people
Sportspeople from Bissau
Bissau-Guinean footballers
Primeira Liga players
Atlético Clube de Portugal players
C.D. Mafra players
Liga I players
FCV Farul Constanța players
CSM Ceahlăul Piatra Neamț players
Cypriot First Division players
Doxa Katokopias FC players
Guinea-Bissau international footballers
Bissau-Guinean expatriate footballers
Bissau-Guinean expatriate sportspeople in Portugal
Expatriate footballers in Portugal
Expatriate footballers in Romania
Bissau-Guinean expatriate sportspeople in Romania
Expatriate footballers in Cyprus
Bissau-Guinean expatriate sportspeople in Cyprus
Association football midfielders